U.S. Sassuolo Calcio Youth Sector comprises the under-19 team and the academy of Italian professional football club U.S. Sassuolo Calcio. The under-19 squad competes in the Campionato Primavera 1.

Primavera

Current squad

Notable former Primavera and youth team players
The following is a list of players coming from Sassuolo Primavera team, that had a continuous career aftermath.

 Claud Adjapong
 Domenico Berardi
 Leonardo Fontanesi 
 Nicholas Pierini 
 Giacomo Raspadori 
 Gianluca Scamacca 
 Davide Frattesi

References

External links

U.S. Sassuolo Calcio
Football clubs in Italy
Football academies in Italy